Sparkadia is an Australian band, formed in Sydney in 2004. They were originally known as The Spark. The band is brainchild of Alexander Burnett (vocals, guitar) and Dave Hall (drums), the band became a reality with the addition of Nick Rabone (bass) and Josephine Ayling (keyboards, guitar, vocals) in 2006. In 2008 Ayling was replaced by Tiffany Preece on guitars and vocals. By 2009 Sparkadia was Burnett's solo project. Sparkadia has released two studio albums, Postcards (31 May 2008) and The Great Impression (18 March 2011).

Band history

2004–2007: Formation and Things Behind the Sun
Sparkadia formed as a duo in 2004 in Sydney by Alexander Burnett on lead vocals and David Hall on drums.

On 17 February 2007 Sparkadia released their debut extended play titled, Things Behind the Sun, on Boundary Sounds through Inertia Records, which peaked in the ARIA Singles Chart top 100 for four weeks in March–April. 

In 2007, Sparkadia supported Elbow on their tour of Australia following the release of the Things Behind the Sun EP. This was followed by a tour of the UK that included supporting Irish band The Thrills, whom they were to support again the following year on their Australian tour.

2008–2009: Postcards
In May 2008, the band released "Too Much to Do", the second single from their debut studio album. "Too Much to Do" reached No. 11 on the ARIA Hitseekers Singles Chart. 

Their first studio album, Postcards, was released on 31 May 2008  and reached number 23 in the ARIA Albums Chart. For the album the line-up were Ayling, Burnett, Hall and Rabone. Soon after Ayling was replaced by Tiffany Preece on guitars and vocals. However, by 2009 Sparkadia had become Burnett's solo project; according to Burnett: Hall had "moved onto other things", Preece had left to have a baby, and Rabone went to India.

In 2008, Sparkadia toured with Jimmy Eat World on their European tour.
 This was followed by shows with Vampire Weekend, as well as their own headline shows across the UK and Europe.

In 2009, the band recorded a cover of "This Boy's in Love" by The Presets for Triple J's Like a Version Volume 5.

In 2009, Sparkadia toured Australia as part of the Big Day Out, before embarking on a string of sold-out shows across Australia before amicably parting ways as a four piece.

2010–2011: The Great Impression
In September 2010 Sparkadia issued the next single, "Talking Like I'm Falling Down Stairs", which peaked in the top 100. Another single, "China", was issued in March 2011. Burnett, as Sparkadia, had moved to London to work on the second album in mid-January 2010. 

The Great Impression was issued on 18 March 2011, which reached number 8 on the ARIA Albums Chart. On 20 March it was the week's "feature album" on national youth radio Triple J.

In March 2011,  Burnett was the featured cover star for Sydney music magazine The Drum, with the tagline "Sparkadia I'll Do It Myself". The feature photo shoot was conducted by award winning music photographer Daniel Boud.

2012–present: Solo work
Following Sparkadia's The Great Impression,  Burnett joined the Nick Cave Straight To You concert series organised by Triple J. He performed on many of the songs on the tour including his own rendition of The Boys Next Door's "Shivers", and the duet "Where the Wild Roses Grow" with Lanie Lane. The subsequent live recording/DVD went on to win an ARIA Award at the ARIA Music Awards of 2012.

From December 2012, Burnett has largely working as a songwriter. He has collaborated and co-written tracks for various artists including DJ Snake, Alison Wonderland, Kaiser Chiefs, Digitalism, George Maple, Flight Facilities,  Elizabeth Rose, Dan Sultan, Thelma Plum, Tieks, LDRU, Rationale and more.

 Burnett also has a deep house project called Antony & Cleopatra, which is based in London. It is a duo with Anita Blay (AKA CocknBullKid), who met in London in 2014 during a pop writing session.

As of 2016,  Alexander Burnett is working on the third Sparkadia album.

Members 
 Alexander Burnett – lead vocals, guitar, keyboards (2004–present)
 David Hall – drums (2004–2009)
 Josephine Ayling – guitar, keyboards, vocals (2006–2008)
 Nick Rabone – bass guitar (2006–2009)
 Tiffany Preece – guitars, vocals (2008–2009)

Discography

Studio albums

Extended plays

Single

References

External links
Official Sparkadia website
Official Alexander Burnett website
Official Antony & Cleopatra website
Sparkadia Discography at Discogs
Sparkadia Discography at AllMusic
Interview with Iain Shedden at The Australian

Australian pop rock groups
Musical groups from Sydney